Lingwala is a municipality (commune) in the Lukunga district of Kinshasa, the capital city of the Democratic Republic of the Congo.

It is situated in northern Kinshasa, south of Gombe and Boulevard du 30 Juin.

Demographics

References

See also 

Communes of Kinshasa
Lukunga District